Yagam is a 1982 Indian Malayalam film, directed and produced by Sivan. The film stars Kalpana, Aranmula Ponnamma, Babu Namboothiri and Jalaja in the lead roles. The film has musical score by M. G. Radhakrishnan. The film won the National Film Award for Best Feature Film in Malayalam. O. N. V. Kurup won the Kerala State Film Award for Best Lyrics for the song "Shravana Sandhyathan". Sivan and Mahesh won the Kerala State Film Award for Best Photography (black-and-white).

Cast
Kalpana
Aranmula Ponnamma
Babu Namboothiri
Jalaja
Premji

Soundtrack
The music was composed by M. G. Radhakrishnan and the lyrics were written by O. N. V. Kurup.

References

External links
 

1980s Malayalam-language films
1982 films
Indian black-and-white films
Films whose cinematographer won the Best Cinematography National Film Award